The RealReal, Inc. is an online and brick-and-mortar marketplace for staff-authenticated luxury consignment. Based on the circular economy, The RealReal sells consigned clothing, fine jewelry, watches, fine art and home decor. It employs an in-house staff of experts including horologists, gemologists, art curators and luxury fashion authenticators who inspect items for authenticity and value; however, the company has received criticism for selling counterfeit merchandise, including from Forbes, which states often a single copywriter, not an authenticator, provides the only inspection for many items sold by The RealReal.

History
The RealReal was founded in 2011 by Julie Wainwright, an e-commerce entrepreneur. By July 2018, the company had raised $288 million in venture capital funding.

In 2017, The RealReal opened its first permanent retail store in New York City and opened pop-ups in San Francisco and Las Vegas. In 2018, it opened its second location in Los Angeles. In 2019, The RealReal opened a third location, its second in New York, on Madison Avenue. In 2020, the company opened its fourth location in San Francisco’s Union Square, a fifth in Chicago on the Magnificent Mile, and a sixth in Palo Alto, California. In 2021, the company opened locations in Brooklyn, New York, Newport Beach, California, Greenwich, Connecticut,  Austin, Texas, Dallas, Marin, California, Atlanta,  Manhasset, New York, and Palm Beach. In 2022, The RealReal opened a location in Brentwood, Los Angeles. As of February 4, 2022, The RealReal had 19 consignment offices across the U.S., 16 of which in its retail stores.

In early 2019, The RealReal announced it would be adding a half-million square foot e-commerce space in Perth Amboy, New Jersey, to its existing e-commerce centers in Secaucus, New Jersey, and Brisbane, California. In 2020, the company announced it signed a lease to open an additional e-commerce center in Phoenix, Arizona.

On May 31, 2019, The RealReal submitted a preliminary filing (S-1) to the SEC to go public.

On June 28, 2019, The RealReal went public on Nasdaq under the symbol REAL and raised $300 million during its IPO.

Counterfeits
The RealReal has had multiple claims from luxury designers that items on their website were counterfeit. In 2018, Chanel filed suit in the Federal Court of the Southern District of New York, alleging The RealReal for hosted counterfeit Chanel on their website and misled customers that an affiliation existed between the two.

In 2019, Richard Kestenbaum, writing for Forbes, disclosed purchasing a bag from The RealReal for $3,600, sold as an authenticated Christian Dior bag, that was found to be counterfeit. Kestenbaum claims the only authentication of many pieces at The RealReal is from a single copywriter, whose main task is to write the descriptions of the merchandise being sold, instead of the expert authenticators The RealReal advertises. In a 2021 update, Kestenbaum wrote about a customer who paid $1,000 for a pair of Christian Dior sneakers from The RealReal, but upon receiving them, was suspicious of their quality and sent the shoes to be authenticated by LegitGrails, a third party authenticator. LegitGrails uses no fewer than four authenticators to authenticate a single item, compared to The RealReal's alleged use of a single copywriter for authentication, and determined the customer's shoes were a "lower grade replica" of Dior sneakers. The RealReal refunded the customer; when Forbes asked the company for a comment, it stated it has the "most rigorous authentication process in the marketplace" and has added artificial intelligence to its authentication process. Forbes claims the large amount of merchandise processed by The RealReal to maintain profit margins (the company went public in 2019) makes it inevitable that counterfeit products slip past its authentication and into the hands of customers.

In early 2020, TheRealReal was sued in a class action lawsuit regarding misstatements to investors, alleging that authenticators were given very little training and strict quotas that resulted in the potential for counterfeit or mislabeled items to make it through the company's authentication process more often than purported.

The RealReal alerts law enforcement of counterfeit items it receives. Items sent to The RealReal deemed "friendly fakes", counterfeit items purchased unintentionally, are usually returned to the client; others are destroyed or retained for training purposes.

Sustainability
In 2017, The RealReal announced a sustainability partnership with luxury fashion brand Stella McCartney, which launched in 2018.
It also established the first Monday in October as National Consignment Day, an annual holiday. The following year, to mark National Consignment day, The RealReal launched a custom sustainability calculator. Developed with environmental consulting firm Shift Advantage, it measures the environmental impact of consignments processed by the company. In 2019, the company marked National Consignment Day by launching a second sustainability partnership with luxury brand Burberry. For National Consignment Day 2020, The RealReal announced its third sustainability partnership with Gucci. When consumers consign or buy Gucci on The RealReal through the end of 2020, a donation will be made to One Tree Planted to support its mission to protect biodiversity and reforestation.

References

External links 
 

Online marketplaces of the United States
Retail companies based in California
Companies based in San Francisco
2011 establishments in California
Retail companies established in 2011
Internet properties established in 2011
American companies established in 2011
2019 initial public offerings
Companies listed on the Nasdaq